Oskar Piotrowski (born 11 August 1996) is a Polish male acrobatic gymnast. Along with his partner, Adam Wojtacki, he competed in the 2014 Acrobatic Gymnastics World Championships.

References

1996 births
Living people
Polish acrobatic gymnasts
Male acrobatic gymnasts
Place of birth missing (living people)